Horus is a genus of pseudoscorpions in the family Olpiidae, containing the following species:
 Horus asper Beier, 1947
 Horus brevipes Beier, 1964
 Horus difficilis Vachon, 1941
 Horus gracilis Beier, 1958
 Horus granulatus (Ellingsen, 1912)
 Horus modestus Chamberlin, 1930
 Horus montanus Beier, 1955
 Horus obscurus (Tullgren, 1907)
 Horus transvaalensis Beier, 1964
 Horus zonatus Beier, 1964

References 

Pseudoscorpion genera
Olpiidae